

Offseason

Recruiting

Regular season

Standings

Schedule
Source:

|-
!colspan=12 style="  "| Exhibition
|-

|-
!colspan=12 style="  "| Regular Season
|-

|-
!colspan=12 style="  "| ECAC Tournament
|-

Roster

2018–19 Raiders

Awards and honors
Jessie Eldridge: ECAC Player of the Month December 2018
Jessie Eldridge: ECAC Player of the Month February 2019
Jessie Eldridge: Women’s Hockey Commissioners Association Player of the Month - February 2019

References

Colgate Raiders
Colgate Raiders women's ice hockey seasons